Tekelloides is a genus of South Pacific araneomorph spiders in the family Cyatholipidae, and was first described by Raymond Robert Forster in 1988.  it contains only two species, both found in New Zealand: T. australis and T. flavonotatus.

References

Araneomorphae genera
Cyatholipidae
Taxa named by Raymond Robert Forster